The Islamic Religio-Cultural Center, colloquially known as the Ljubljana mosque ( or ) is an Islamic mosque and cultural-center complex in the Bežigrad district of Ljubljana, the capital of Slovenia. It is the culmination of a decades-long effort by the Islamic Community of Slovenia. A library, a classroom, an ablution fountain and the Imam's offices and quarters are included in the complex.

History
Many Muslims were among the wave of internal migrants from other Yugoslav republics who gravitated to Slovenia during the 1960s and 1970s. A permit for the construction of a mosque was first requested in 1969, but was not granted; the effort was revived during the 1990s. The 1990s proposal produced a nationalist backlash, with considerable public opposition to the mosque. The City Council made an attempt to call a municipal referendum to prohibit the construction of the mosque in late 2003. Opposed by Ljubljana mayor Danica Simšič as a "constitutionally-forbidden encroachment on the constitutionally-guaranteed rights of a religious minority", the referendum was rejected by the Constitutional Court in July 2004. In December 2008, city councilor Mihael Jarc began gathering signatures for a second referendum, this time to delete the mosque's proposed 40 m minaret, over the opposition of mayor Zoran Janković. This time the Constitutional Court approved the signature-gathering process; the mayor however vowed to continue to fight it.

The reaction among the-then prominent national political parties was mixed; LDS and Zares voiced support for the construction of the mosque; SD, DESUS and SDS remained neutral on the matter, while SNS expressed opposition.

A ceremony was held at the future site of the complex in September 2013 to lay the foundation stone. Construction is expected to begin in November and last about three years.

In February 2020, the mosque was completed and opened to the public.

Site and design
In 2004, a 2800 m2 site on Cesta dveh cesarjev Road was planned, bought by the municipality from the Lazarite order for 350,000 euros to be made available for purchase by the Islamic Community of Slovenia. By late 2008, the location had changed to a plot between Kurilniška and Parmova streets. The design of the center has seen several changes, with the maximum size and height of the structure the subject of debate. A final decision was reached in late 2008. The construction cost is projected to total €12 million. A large donation from Qatar is expected to pay for about 70% of this.

See also
 Islam in Slovenia

References

2020 establishments in Slovenia
Bežigrad District
Buildings and structures in Ljubljana
Mosques in Slovenia
Mosques completed in 2020
Mosque